In art and iconography, a motif is an element of an image.  The term can be used both of figurative and narrative art, and ornament and geometrical art.  A motif may be repeated in a pattern or design, often many times, or may just occur once in a work.

A motif may be an element in the iconography of a particular subject or type of subject that is seen in other works, or may form the main subject, as the Master of Animals motif in ancient art typically does. The related motif of confronted animals is often seen alone, but may also be repeated, for example in Byzantine silk and other ancient textiles.  Where the main subject of an artistic work such as a painting is a specific person, group, or moment in a narrative, that should be referred to as the "subject" of the work, not a motif, though the same thing may be a "motif" when part of another subject, or part of a work of decorative art such as a painting on a vase.

Ornamental or decorative art can usually be analysed into a number of different elements, which can be called motifs. These may often, as in textile art, be repeated many times in a pattern. Important examples in Western art include acanthus, egg and dart, and various types of scrollwork.

Some examples
Geometric, typically repeated: Meander, palmette, rosette, gul in Oriental rugs, acanthus, egg and dart, Bead and reel, Pakudos, Swastika, Adinkra symbols.

Figurative: Master of Animals, confronted animals, velificatio, Death and the Maiden, Three hares, Sheela na gig, puer mingens.  In the Nativity of Jesus in art, the detail of showing Saint Joseph as asleep, which was common in medieval depictions, can be regarded as a "motif".  

Many designs in Islamic culture are motifs, including those of the sun, moon, animals such as horses and lions, flowers, and landscapes. Motifs can have emotional effects and be used for propaganda. In kilim flatwoven carpets, motifs such as the hands-on-hips elibelinde are woven in to the design to express the hopes and concerns of the weavers: the elibelinde symbolises the female principle and fertility, including the desire for children.

Pennsylvania Dutch hex signs are a familiar type of motif in the eastern portions of the United States. Their circular and symmetric design, and their use of brightly colored patterns from nature, such as stars, compass roses, doves, hearts, tulips, leaves, and feathers have made them quite popular.

The idea of a motif has become used more broadly in discussing literature and other narrative arts for an element in the story that represents a theme.

Gallery

See also
Three hares

Notes

Further reading
Hoffman, Richard. Decorative Flower and Leaf Designs. Dover Publications (1991), 
Jones, Owen. The Grammar of Ornament. Dover Publications, Revised edition (1987), 
Welch, Patricia Bjaaland.  Chinese art: a guide to motifs and visual imagery. Turtle Publishing (2008),

External links

Visual motifs (essay) Theater of Drawing

 
Decorative arts
Iconography